Silver Banshee is a supervillain appearing in comic books published by DC Comics, primarily as an opponent of Superman. In television, she has been portrayed by Odessa Rae in Smallville and Italia Ricci in the Arrowverse series Supergirl.

Publication history

Silver Banshee first appeared in Action Comics #595 and was created by John Byrne.

Fictional character biography

Siobhan McDougal
Siobhan McDougal was the first-born child of Garrett McDougal, the patriarch of an old Gaelic clan that has occupied an island midway between Scotland and Ireland for a thousand generations. On that island is Castle Broen, where first-born McDougals undergo a ritual to prove themselves worthy to lead the clan. When Siobhan was young, she traveled the world, only returning to Castle Broen when she heard of her father's death. Her uncle Seamus determined that no woman would lead the clan and intended her brother Bevan to become the new patriarch. She went ahead with the family ritual by herself, which involved calling on supernatural forces for power. She was interrupted by Bevan, and the distraction proved disastrous as she was dragged away into an infernal netherworld. An entity called "the Crone" granted her powers and the ability to return to Earth as the Silver Banshee, but demanded payment in the form of an occult book that belonged to her father. She found that her father's book collection had been shipped off for sale in the United States. Her quest brought her to Metropolis. Killing anyone that stood in the way of her search attracted the attention of Superman, who was able to defeat her when he realised that she could only kill a person once as she turned away from someone who resembled a previous victim. By faking his death, Superman was able to enlist the Martian Manhunter to attack Banshee by posing as Superman's ghost. Unable to defeat Superman, she chose to retreat and continue her mission at a later date.

Silver Banshee returned to Metropolis twice more, but was halted both times by Superman. It was Batman who finally found the book among some stolen goods in Gotham City. Superman brought the book to Castle Broen where he was confronted by Silver Banshee. The Crone appeared at the castle, and after an enigmatic warning to Superman, she dragged the Banshee, Bevan, and Seamus off to her Netherworld.

In Leesburg, Supergirl rescued Silver Banshee from Satanus' Netherworld when the chaos flow brought the river Styx to the town. Silver Banshee was left in a confused state, eventually going back to her psychotic persona and using Supergirl's friend Mattie as a host while rampaging on the streets. Mattie and Silver Banshee thus proceeded to nearby Schnaffenburg where Mattie tried to get revenge on Gerald McFee, who killed her brother during "Final Night" while in thrall to Gorilla Grodd. Supergirl calmed Silver Banshee, separating Mattie from her, which led to Silver Banshee temporarily vanishing.

Silver Banshee was one of the final four villains - along with Bizarro, Mongul, and the Master Jailer - to be sent against Superman by Manchester Black, the latter using his powers to make Banshee and Bizarro sane enough to tactically outthink Superman, also granting Banshee awareness of his Kryptonian name so that she could use her magic against him more effectively. Despite this, Superman was able to defeat the four, forcing Mongul to expend his energy before dropping a nuclear-powered superhuman onto the deserted island that they were currently inhabiting.

Silver Banshee attempted to collect the billion dollar bounty Lex Luthor placed on Superman's head in Superman/Batman #3, but failed, with Batman using an ultrasonic generator to keep her nullified.

Silver Banshee later joined the Secret Society headed by Alexander Luthor. She was one of the members who turned on Black Adam when Luthor needed him for his machine. She also took part in the Battle of Metropolis.

Silver Banshee battles Supergirl in Supergirl #34, and is expected to be a recurring nemesis for Supergirl, as well as Superman, as part of an attempt to tie Supergirl's book in with Superman's titles.

In Superman #682, Supergirl was used as a diversion as some members of Kandor captured Silver Banshee, placing her in the Phantom Zone. Later, Superman freed Silver Banshee to be taken to Belle Reve.

Inspector Henderson with other police officers break into an apartment, but it explodes and then they find a corpse covered in runes. Kara meets with Inspector Henderson, who's following a case his old mentor was never able to close, and thinks it has to do with items Silver Banshee needs to lift her curse. Inspector Henderson finds his mentor had the item, but it imbeds itself in Inspector Henderson's hand, allowing Silver Banshee to track him. Silver Banshee shows up and fights Supergirl, but Supergirl opens a package from Henderson and becomes possessed by a Banshee hybrid. Banshee-Supergirl and the Silver Banshee battle each other as events are recapped. Supergirl tells Silver Banshee they hid the artifacts in people, to keep them hidden from her. Apparently all the items were hidden not as a curse, but as a test for prospective clan leaders. Henderson punches Banshee-Supergirl, which is effective because of the artifact in his hand. Supergirl tries to exorcise the spirits possessing her but fails. Henderson realizes the spirits are tied to the artifacts and can be used against them. He then stabs his hand and breaks Supergirl free from her spirits. Silver Banshee then uses her wails to disperse the spirits. She finally uses magic to remove the artifacts from Henderson's hand and lets him know she is indebted to him.

Siobhan Smythe
In the 2011 reboot of DC's superhero continuity, The New 52, Siobhan Smythe first appears in Supergirl vol. 6 #7 as a girl from Dublin who had immigrated to the United States to start a new life after her mother died, and to escape her father (the also-dead Black Banshee). She befriends Supergirl, and stood up to the National Guard who tried to gun Supergirl down, as she could clearly see that Supergirl had saved the city from Kryptonian Worldkillers, but is the only one who can speak her language. She invites Kara to live with her, and brings her along to a cafe where she performs music when her dead father, the Black Banshee, attacks, prompting her to transform into the Silver Banshee. The two fight Black Banshee only for Supergirl to be absorbed into the villain's body. While inside she relives nightmarish versions of her own memories and encounters Tom Smythe, Siobhan's brother. He explains how the Banshee is a curse passed down along his family line and how Black Banshee had plans for his daughter to join him in conquering the world. Tom had sacrificed himself in Siobhan's place, hoping it would end the curse. Instead he only managed to delay it. Fighting Black Banshee together, they succeeded in escaping and defeated him for good. Siobhan reverted to normal and was reunited with her brother. Later Supergirl left them, feeling she was only putting them in danger by being around them.

Siobhan later appears in the Red Daughter of Krypton storyline, when Supergirl gets taken over by a Red Lantern Ring after a battle with Lobo. Siobhan transforms into Silver Banshee again but struggles for control over her body. Due to Supergirl's vulnerability to magic, Siobhan manages to hold her own against her and uses her sonic abilities to teleport herself and a berserk Kara from New York to the Catskill Mountains to avoid casualties. Unable to defeat Kara, she manages to convince her to leave Earth before she ravages the entire planet.

Powers and abilities
Both incarnations of the Silver Banshee possess preternatural levels of strength and resistance to injury powerful enough to prove physically challenging for super-powered Kryptonians like Superman and Supergirl respectively. While not completely invulnerable, they are able to wound Kryptonians to a limited degree when they exert their full strength. While physically powerful, a Banshee's signature weapon is her sonic scream or "death wail". Her cry kills anyone who hears it, provided she knows their full name, reducing them to desiccated husks as the scream drains their life-force to strengthen the Banshee, akin to a succubus or psychic vampire.

As Siobhan Smythe of The New 52 continuity, the Silver Banshee has exhibited an affinity for "omnilingualism" - able to instinctively speak any language fluently from the first moment she hears it, including being able to commune with animals (such as talking to a flock of doves).

Silver Banshee also appears in the animated series Justice League Unlimited; her scream in this version has the ability to kill anyone by aging them to death.

Other versions
In the 2003-04 limited series JLA/Avengers, Silver Banshee appears as a villain in Metropolis under Krona's control. She helps to take down Aquaman while he is searching the city with the Vision, but is ultimately defeated by Wonder Woman.

In the 1998 miniseries JLA: The Nail, the Silver Banshee makes an appearance in Professor Hamilton's Cadmus Labs.

In other media

Television

 A variation of Silver Banshee appears in the Smallville episode "Escape", portrayed by Odessa Rae. This version is a deceased Gaelic heroine who was cursed, placed in the underworld, and needs to possess a host.
 Silver Banshee appears in Justice League Unlimited, voiced by Kim Mai Guest. This version is a member of Gorilla Grodd's Secret Society who can drain people of life energy, aging them to death in seconds. Prior to and during the episode "Alive!", Lex Luthor takes control of the Society, but Grodd mounts a mutiny against him. Silver Banshee sides with the latter, but is knocked out by Star Sapphire and killed off-screen by Darkseid along with Grodd's other loyalists.
 A character based on Silver Banshee named Scream Queen appears in the teaser for the Batman: The Brave and the Bold episode "Trials of the Demon!".
 The Siobhan Smythe incarnation of Silver Banshee appears in Supergirl, portrayed by Italia Ricci. Introduced in the episode "Truth, Justice and the American Way", Smythe is hired by Cat Grant as the latter's new primary assistant, much to Kara Danvers' displeasure. In the episode "Worlds Finest", Smythe attempts to date Winn Schott, but becomes distracted by her grudge against Danvers. While in a drunken rage, Smythe falls from a high-rise rooftop, but her abilities emerge and cushion the fall. After being inspected by the Department of Extranormal Operations (DEO), she seeks answers from her aunt, who tells her that the women in their family are cursed by a banshee spirit that can only be satisfied if they kill the object of their rage. Smythe joins forces with Livewire in an attempt to kill Supergirl, Danvers, and Grant, only to be defeated by Supergirl and a group of firefighters. Smythe and Livewire are later incarcerated in National City Prison's newly built metahuman wing.
 The Siobhan McDougal incarnation of Silver Banshee appears in the DC Super Hero Girls episode "#SchoolGhoul", voiced by Cristina Milizia. Centuries prior in medieval Scotland, she was chosen to lead her family's clan. Angry that he was not chosen, her brother killed her, stole a family heirloom, and went on to become Headmaster McDougal of the McDougal Academy private school, which Siobhan haunted ever since in search of the heirloom. While fighting Katana in the present, Siobhan ends up in the latter's sword, where she reveals her history and quest. After confronting Siobhan's brother, he hands over leadership of the family clan back to her and apologizes, allowing Siobhan to leave McDougal Academy in peace.

Film
 Silver Banshee makes a non-speaking appearance in Superman/Batman: Public Enemies.
 The Siobhan McDougal incarnation of Silver Banshee appears in Batman Unlimited: Monster Mayhem, voiced by Kari Wuhrer. She and several supervillains join the Joker's gang of monsters to wreak mayhem on Gotham City.
 According to concept art, Silver Banshee was originally planned to appear in The Lego Batman Movie.
 The Siobhan Smythe incarnation of Silver Banshee appears in Suicide Squad: Hell to Pay, voiced by Julie Nathanson. She was hired by Professor Zoom to help him retrieve a "Get Out of Hell Free" card in exchange for his help in getting revenge on her former clan for banishing her, only to be killed by Killer Frost.

Video games
 Silver Banshee appears as a playable character in DC Unchained. 
 Silver Banshee appears as a playable character in DC Legends.
 Silver Banshee appears as a playable character in the mobile version of Injustice 2.
 The Siobhan McDougal incarnation of Silver Banshee appears as a playable character in Lego DC Super-Villains, voiced again by Julie Nathanson.

Miscellaneous
Silver Banshee appears in DC Super Hero Girls as a member of Super Hero High School's debate team and a rock vocalist in the school's band club.

See also
 List of Superman enemies

References

External links
 Silver Banshee at Comic Vine

DC Comics characters who can move at superhuman speeds
DC Comics characters who can teleport
DC Comics characters with accelerated healing
DC Comics characters with superhuman strength
DC Comics female superheroes
DC Comics female supervillains
DC Comics martial artists
DC Comics metahumans
Comics characters introduced in 1987
Fictional characters who can manipulate sound
Fictional characters with fire or heat abilities
Fictional characters with spirit possession or body swapping abilities
Fictional characters with superhuman durability or invulnerability
Fictional immigrants to the United States
Fictional Irish people
Fictional monsters
Characters created by John Byrne (comics)
Mythology in DC Comics
Superman characters
Works based on European myths and legends
Villains in animated television series

de:Schurken im Superman-Universum#Silver Banshee